Sarangpur (also known as Salangpur) is a village in the Botad District in the state of Gujarat, India. Sarangpur is known throughout India for the historic Shri Kashtabhanjan Hanumanji temple and BAPS Swaminarayan Mandir located in the village.

The village of about 3000 lies at the border of Ahmedabad district. The nearest city is Botad. The various families are Patel (Leuva Patel), Darbar (Kshatriya), Rajput, Darji, Kumbhar, Harijan, Bharvad, Koli etc.

The village is about 153 km. away from Ahmedabad. To visit this place during the early morning, 10:30 pm & 12:30 pm buses run to and from Ahmedabad.

Temples

Hanuman temple, Sarangpur is a Hindu temple (mandir) located in Sarangpur, Gujarat and comes under the Vadtal Gadi of the Swaminarayan Sampraday. It is the only Swaminarayan temple which has the murtis of neither Swaminarayan nor Krishna as the primary object of worship. It is dedicated to Hanuman in the form of Kashtbhanjan (Crusher of sorrows).

Smruti temples of Shastri Yagnapurushdas and Pramukh Swami Maharaj, who succeeded Yagnapurushdas are also located near BAPS mandir.

Sarangpur is also known for its BAPS Shri Swaminarayan Shikharbaddha mandir, built in 1916 by Shastri Yagnapurushdas which is the second highest temple in Gujarat at exactly 108 feet (108 is an auspicious number within the Swaminarayan Sampraday). It is a headquarters and training hub for newly enrolled monks (sadhus).

In Gujarati, 'Sarang' means peacock. "Sarangpur" - a place where peacocks live. There are many in the gardens of the BAPS Swaminarayan temple.

Every year thousands of devotees gather at the temple to celebrate Holi - the festival of colours.

The Swaminarayan temple at Kundal is located about 10 km east of Sarangapur, close to the highway. This complex is very big and serene.

Swaminarayan temples at Botad, located 10 km west of Sarangapur, are also popular.

References

External links
 Official website Kastbhanjan Hanumanji temple Official website BAPS Swaminarayan Mandir (Temple)

Gallery

Villages in Ahmedabad district
Settlements in Gujarat